S-cedilla (majuscule: Ş, minuscule: ş) is a letter used in some of the Turkic languages. It occurs in the Azerbaijani, Gagauz, Turkish, and Turkmen alphabets. It is also planned to be in the Latin-based Kazakh alphabet.
It is used in Brahui, Chechen, Crimean Tatar, Kurdish, and Tatar as well, when they are written in the Latin alphabet.

It commonly represents /ʃ/, the voiceless postalveolar fricative (like sh in  -şoe- shoe).

It is written as the letter S with a cedilla below and it has both the lower-case (U+015F) and the upper-case variants (U+15E).

Romanian 

In early versions of Unicode, the Romanian letter Ș (S-comma) was considered a glyph variant of Ş, and therefore was not present in the Unicode Standard. It is also not present in the Windows 1250 (Central Europe) code page. The letter was only added to the standard in Unicode 3.0, and some texts in Romanian still use Ş instead.

Character encoding 

HTML entity (HTML 5 only, not supported on all browsers):

Related characters & digraphs 
T-cedilla (Ţ)
S-comma (Ș)
S-caron (Š), which is also used to represent [ʃ]
C-cedilla (Ç) 
Cyrillic Sha (Ш)
Sh, a digraph used in English and other languages

References 

Latin letters with diacritics
Turkish language